Waseem Ahmed (born 11 December 1993) is an Indian cricketer. He made his first-class debut for Madhya Pradesh in the 2017–18 Ranji Trophy on 6 October 2017.

References

External links
 

1993 births
Living people
Indian cricketers
People from Gwalior
Madhya Pradesh cricketers